Košarkaški klub Napredak Junior is a men's professional basketball club based in Kruševac, Serbia. The club currently participates in the 2nd-tier Second Basketball League of Serbia.

History 
In August 2017, the club changed its name to KK Napredak Junior and a legal entity as well.

Logos

Players

Coaches

Napredak
  Dragan Kostić (1992–1993)
  Nebojša Raičević (1994–1995)
  Miodrag Bojković (1997–1998)
  Aleksandar Bućan (2004–2005)
  Dragan Vaščanin (2005)
  Aleksandar Bućan (2006–2007)
  Vladimir Androić
  Bratislav Knežević (2010–2011)
  Bojan Kusmuk (2011–2012)
  Boško Đokić (2013–2014)
  Nebojša Raičević (2014–2016)
  Oliver Popović (2016–2017)

Napredak Junior
  Bratislav Knežević (2017–2018)
  Dejan Đokić (2018–2019)
  Vladimir Mišković (2019–2020)
  Ljubiša Damjanović (2020)
  Marko Cvetković (2020–2022)

Notable former players
  Boban Petrović
  Marko Jeremić
  Dragan Milosavljević
  Čedomir Vitkovac
  Vojdan Stojanovski

References

External links
 
 KK Napredak Kruševac at srbijasport.net

Napredak Krusevac
Basketball teams established in 1946
Sport in Kruševac
Basketball teams in Yugoslavia
1946 establishments in Serbia